R v Negus (1873) LR 2 CP 34 is an old English law case under the Larceny Acts which addressed the then definition of "control" for the purpose of determining who was a worker.

Mr Justice Blackburn held,

See also
Contract of employment
UK labour law
Yewens v Noakes

United Kingdom labour case law
Lord Blackburn cases
1873 in case law
1873 in British law
English law articles needing infoboxes